Wild Roses is a Canadian television drama series, which aired from January 6 to March 31, 2009 on CBC Television. Originally titled Cowgirls, CBC requested the change to Wild Roses after testing the title. The show was officially cancelled by the CBC on April 22, 2009, after only one season.

Plot

The series focuses on the conflict between the McGregors, a family of wealthy oil developers residing on Montrose Ranch, and the Henrys, a widow and her three daughters living in the neighbouring Rivercross Ranch. Prior to the series, Rivercross used to belong to the McGregors, but was given to the Henrys by the now-deceased head of the McGregor family. The current head of the McGregor family, David, resented this decision and wants to take back Rivercross. Shortly before the beginning of the series, David McGregor provided a loan to the Henrys to help them operate their ranch with the promise to repay $10,000 back monthly. As the series begin, the Henrys have defaulted on roughly $60,000 in monthly payments, and David tries to foreclose on the property.

Main characters

The Henry Family
 Maggie (Kim Huffman) is the widowed mother of three daughters, who sought the financial aid of her neighbour David McGregor in order to support her family. Maggie is a strong woman, ripe with clear values and morals only impeded by her superficial mother (Kate Trotter).
Kate (Michelle Harrison), Maggie's oldest daughter, works on the ranch primarily trying to keep Rivercross afloat.
Lucy (Sarah Power), Maggie's second daughter, assists with the ranch, but has taken on other jobs for the security of a regular paycheck.
Charlotte (Clare Stone) is Maggie's youngest daughter, and is adopted into the family.

The McGregor Family
 David McGregor (Gary Hudson), the CEO and president of McGregor Oil, is a wealthy oil baron who is trying to acquire Rivercross Ranch from the Henrys. He has offered a sizable operating loan to the Henrys but when they could not pay the monthly mortgage, he has intentions to foreclose and take the ranch. He has discovered a vast oil find in the region.
 Will McGregor (Steve Byers), the smart and educated son works with David.
 Peter McGregor (Adam MacDonald) is the complete opposite of Will, effectively the black sheep of the family.
 Rebecca McGregor (Amy Ciupak Lalonde) is the conniving daughter who will quite readily seduce David's business partners to help sway the business in favour of the McGregors. She is currently engaged to Trevor Faulkner (Paul Christie).

Other Characters
 Trevor Faulkner (Paul Christie) is a member of the Alberta Legislative Assembly and fiancé to Rebecca.  The relationship between Rebecca and Trevor appears to be one of mutual benefit.  In Episode 6, it is discovered that Trevor had a previous homosexual relationship with former university buddy Ethan.  Rebecca learns of this and turns a blind eye.
Dillon Parker (Dylan Neal) is a geologist who has begun dating Maggie. When she finds out that Dillon is David's geologist, Maggie is hesitant but continues the relationship, only to discover that he later disappears.  (Episodes 1-6)

Production
The show is primarily shot at The Window Studio as well as on location in Calgary, Alberta, and surrounding areas within a one-hour drive such as Bragg Creek and Bearspaw.

 McGregor Oil, The Henry Home and Crossbar Ranch (interior) scenes are filmed at The Window Studio in Calgary. The McGregor Ranch  is shot at a home located in the rural community of Bearspaw, northwest of Calgary.
 The Broken Shoulder restaurant is located in Bragg Creek.

Common shooting locations around Calgary include Stephen Avenue, Inglewood, Bankers Hall Towers and numerous locations in the downtown core. One of the major shots commonly seen in the series is the overlooking Rocky Mountains and rolling foothills, a signature landscape associated with Calgary.

Opening Credits Theme
The opening theme song is Scottish singer KT Tunstall.  "Black Horse and the Cherry Tree" was a hit single and released in February 2005.  The song was also featured on Tunstall's album Eye to the Telescope, and also on American Idol (Season 5).

Scenes shown in the opening sequence feature various locations within Calgary and its remarkable skyline. Watermarked in the sequence is the family trees of the McGregors and the Henrys.  Locals to the Calgary area will notice landmarks such as the Cash Corner in Inglewood, skyline shot from the northeast corner of Memorial Dr and Deerfoot Tr (freeway intersection), Bankers Hall, Calgary Stampede, to name a few.

Symbolism
The sequence is key to show the two-way spectrum of Good and Evil between the two families.  
 Henrys represent the "Good", white, wholesome, do-gooder
 McGregors represent the "Bad", black, greed, opportunistic

At the end of the sequence this is visible among a large table, McGregors on the right side dressed in black, and dining in what appears to be a catered event.  On the opposite end of the table, the  Henrys dressed in white and dining in what appears to be a casual and more wholesome event.  This is the epitome of the series and the basis of which these two families rest their principles upon.

Episodes

References

External links

 Wild Roses
 

2009 Canadian television series debuts
CBC Television original programming
2000s Canadian drama television series
Television shows set in Calgary
2009 Canadian television series endings
Canadian television soap operas
Television shows filmed in Calgary
Canadian Western (genre) television series